Albert Fisher may refer to:

Albert Fisher (Detroit) (1864–1942), American automobile pioneer
Albert Fisher (footballer) (1881–1937), English footballer
Albert Kenrick Fisher (1856–1948), American ornithologist
Albert J. Fisher (1842–1882), American photographer
Al Fisher (born 1986), American basketball player 
Albert Fisher, namesake  of the historic Albert Fisher Mansion and Carriage House in Utah, United States

See also
Albert Fish (disambiguation)